(born 22 January 1971) is a Japanese former volleyball player who competed in the 1992 Summer Olympics. He also competed in the Summer Universiade in 1993 as the main outside attacker of his national squad, and won the Gold Medal.

References

1971 births
Living people
Japanese men's volleyball players
Olympic volleyball players of Japan
Volleyball players at the 1992 Summer Olympics
Asian Games medalists in volleyball
Volleyball players at the 1994 Asian Games
Volleyball players at the 2002 Asian Games
Medalists at the 1994 Asian Games
Medalists at the 2002 Asian Games
Asian Games gold medalists for Japan
Asian Games bronze medalists for Japan
20th-century Japanese people
21st-century Japanese people